Thievy Guivane Bifouma Koulossa (born 13 May 1992) is a professional footballer who plays as a forward for Super League Greece club OFI.

He spent most of his early career in Spain, totalling 68 La Liga games and eight goals for Espanyol, Almería and Granada in addition to a season on loan at Las Palmas in the Segunda División. As well as brief spells in England with West Bromwich Albion and France with Reims and Bastia, he represented four clubs in Turkey's Süper Lig.

Formerly a youth international for France, where he was born, Bifouma made his senior debut for the Congo in 2014. He competed at the 2015 Africa Cup of Nations, where he was joint top scorer.

Club career

Espanyol
Bifouma was born in Saint-Denis, Seine-Saint-Denis. He joined RCD Espanyol in Spain in early 2010, not yet aged 18, signing from RC Strasbourg Alsace. On 13 March 2011, he made his debut with the Catalans' first team, after coming on as a substitute for Joan Verdú in the dying minutes of a 2–0 La Liga home win against Deportivo de La Coruña.

On 10 August 2011, in the Copa Catalunya final, Bifouma scored a hat-trick in a 3–0 victory over a FC Barcelona team that was filled with reserve and youth players. On 17 December, he netted his first goal with the main squad, scoring the opener in an eventual 2–1 away defeat of Sporting de Gijón.

In September 2012, Bifouma was loaned to UD Las Palmas of Segunda División. After a successful spell, he extended his contract with Espanyol until 2017.

On 31 January 2014, Bifouma signed for West Bromwich Albion on a loan deal with a view to a permanent transfer, being awarded the number 50 shirt. He made his debut in the Premier League eight days later, playing the second half and scoring within 36 seconds of taking the pitch in a 3–1 away loss against Crystal Palace.

Bifouma moved to fellow top-division club UD Almería on 13 August 2014, in a season-long loan. On 19 March of the following year, he was suspended for one month due to allegations of breach of contract with his former agent; the ban was lifted days later, and he continued to appear regularly for the Andalusians, which suffered relegation.

On 19 August 2015, Bifouma was loaned to Granada CF of the same league for one year. He finished the season with Stade de Reims, also owned by Espanyol.

Turkey
On 28 July 2016, Bifouma signed for fellow French Ligue 1 club SC Bastia. He was on the move again in the following transfer window, joining Süper Lig's Osmanlıspor on a three-and-a-half-year deal. He scored just one goal in 22 total games for the team from Ankara, in their 5–1 win at Adanaspor in the Süper Lig on 19 February 2017.

Remaining in the same league, Bifouma signed a one-year contract with Sivasspor on 9 September 2017. Only eight days later, he netted twice in a 4–2 victory on his return to the Osmanlı Stadium.

Bifouma went back to the Turkish capital in June 2018, agreeing to a three-year deal at MKE Ankaragücü. He scored once during his brief tenure, a late consolation in a 2–1 home defeat to Kasımpaşa S.K. on 2 September, and moved on again on 22 January 2019 when he signed with third-placed Yeni Malatyaspor for an undisclosed fee. On 15 December that year, he scored in a 2–0 win at Beşiktaş J.K. which broke the Istanbul club's six-match winning streak.

On 17 July 2020, Bifouma moved to the Chinese Super League's Shenzhen F.C. on an undisclosed contract for a fee of around €3 million. The following 19 April, he was released by mutual accord and signed for Heilongjiang Ice City F.C. in the country's second tier.

Ten months after leaving China with no goals and one assist to his name from nine appearances, Bifouma returned to Turkey in February 2022, signing for a Bursaspor side fighting to remain in the TFF First League. He was one of 17 players to leave following their relegation.

International career
A French youth international, Bifouma opted to represent Congo at the senior level, receiving a FIFA clearance on 1 August 2014. He made his full debut a day later, replacing Julsy Boukama-Kaya in the 68th minute of a 2–0 away loss against Rwanda in the second leg of the 2015 Africa Cup of Nations second qualification round.

On 6 September 2014, in the same competition, Bifouma scored a brace in a 3–2 win in Nigeria. At the 2015 Africa Cup of Nations finals, he netted Congo's first goal of the tournament in a 1–1 draw with hosts Equatorial Guinea. He also scored the opener in their 2–1 group phase victory over Burkina Faso, a result which qualified the nation to the quarter-finals for the first time since 1992, where he grabbed his final goal against the DR Congo, putting his team ahead 2–0 but in an eventual 4–2 defeat; with three goals, he was one of five joint top scorers.

Having missed over two years of games for reasons including travel restrictions in China during the COVID-19 pandemic, Bifouma was recalled to the Congolese squad in September 2020. He finally played again the following 26 March, in a goalless draw at home to Senegal in 2021 Africa Cup of Nations qualification.

Career statistics

Club

International

Scores and results list Congo's goal tally first, score column indicates score after each Bifouma goal.

References

External links

1992 births
Living people
French sportspeople of Republic of the Congo descent
Sportspeople from Saint-Denis, Seine-Saint-Denis
Black French sportspeople
French footballers
Republic of the Congo footballers
Footballers from Seine-Saint-Denis
Association football forwards
La Liga players
Segunda División players
Tercera División players
RCD Espanyol B footballers
RCD Espanyol footballers
UD Las Palmas players
UD Almería players
Granada CF footballers
Premier League players
West Bromwich Albion F.C. players
Ligue 1 players
Stade de Reims players
SC Bastia players
Süper Lig players
TFF First League players
Ankaraspor footballers
Sivasspor footballers
MKE Ankaragücü footballers
Yeni Malatyaspor footballers
Bursaspor footballers
Chinese Super League players
Shenzhen F.C. players
Heilongjiang Ice City F.C. players
Super League Greece players
OFI Crete F.C. players
France youth international footballers
France under-21 international footballers
Republic of the Congo international footballers
2015 Africa Cup of Nations players
French expatriate footballers
Republic of the Congo expatriate footballers
Expatriate footballers in Spain
Expatriate footballers in England
Expatriate footballers in Turkey
Expatriate footballers in China
Expatriate footballers in Greece
French expatriate sportspeople in Spain
French expatriate sportspeople in England
French expatriate sportspeople in Turkey
French expatriate sportspeople in China
French expatriate sportspeople in Greece
Republic of the Congo expatriate sportspeople in Spain
Republic of the Congo expatriate sportspeople in England
Republic of the Congo expatriate sportspeople in Turkey
Republic of the Congo expatriate sportspeople in China
Republic of the Congo expatriate sportspeople in Greece